A low-noise amplifier (LNA) is an electronic amplifier that amplifies a very low-power signal without significantly degrading its signal-to-noise ratio. An amplifier will increase the power of both the signal and the noise present at its input, but the amplifier will also introduce some additional noise. LNAs are designed to minimize that additional noise. Designers can minimize additional noise by choosing low-noise components, operating points, and circuit topologies. Minimizing additional noise must balance with other design goals such as power gain and impedance matching.

LNAs are found in radio communications systems, medical instruments and electronic test equipment. A typical LNA may supply a power gain of 100 (20 decibels (dB)) while decreasing the signal-to-noise ratio by less than a factor of two (a 3 dB noise figure (NF)). Although LNAs are primarily concerned with weak signals that are just above the noise floor, they must also consider the presence of larger signals that cause intermodulation distortion.

Communications 
Antennas are a common source of weak signals. An outdoor antenna is often connected to its receiver by a transmission line called a feed line.

This feed line loss can be avoided by placing an LNA at the antenna, which supplies enough gain to offset the loss.

An LNA is a key component at the front-end of a radio receiver circuit to help reduce unwanted noise in particular.  Friis' formulas for noise models the noise in a multi-stage signal collection circuit. In most receivers, the overall NF is dominated by the first few stages of the RF front end.

By using an LNA close to the signal source, the effect of noise from subsequent stages of the receive chain in the circuit is reduced by the signal gain created by the LNA, while the noise created by the LNA itself is injected directly into the received signal. The LNA boosts the desired signals' power while adding as little noise and distortion as possible. The work done by the LNA enables optimum retrieval of the desired signal in the later stages of the system.

Design considerations 
Low noise amplifiers are the building blocks of communication systems and instruments. The most important LNA specifications or attributes are:
 Gain
 Noise figure
 Linearity
 Maximum RF input

A good LNA has a low NF (e.g. ), enough gain to boost the signal (e.g. ) and a large enough inter-modulation and compression point (IP3 and P1dB) to do the work required of it. Further specifications are the LNA's operating bandwidth, gain flatness, stability, input and output voltage standing wave ratio (VSWR).

For low noise, a high amplification is required for the amplifier in the first stage. Therefore, junction field-effect transistors (JFETs) and high-electron-mobility transistors (HEMTs) are often used. They are driven in a high-current regime, which is not energy-efficient, but reduces the relative amount of shot noise. It also requires input and output impedance matching circuits for narrow-band circuits to enhance the gain (see Gain-bandwidth product).

Gain 
Amplifiers need a device to provide gain.  In the 1940s, that device was a vacuum tube, but now it is usually a transistor.  The transistor may be one of many varieties of bipolar transistors or field-effect transistors. Other devices producing gain, such as tunnel diodes, may be used.

Broadly speaking, two categories of transistor models are used in LNA design: Small-signal models use quasi-linear models of noise and large-signal models consider non-linear mixing.

The amount of gain applied is often a compromise. On one hand, high gain makes weak signals strong.  On the other hand, high gain means higher level signals, and such high level signals with high gain may exceed the amplifier's dynamic range or cause other types of noise such as harmonic distortion or nonlinear mixing.

Noise figure
The noise figure helps determine the efficiency of a particular LNA. LNA suitability for a particular application is typically based on its noise figure. In general, a low noise figure results in better signal reception.

Impedance 
The circuit topology affects input and output impedance. In general, the source impedance is matched to the input impedance because that will maximize the power transfer from the source to the device. If the source impedance is low, then a common base or common gate circuit topology may be appropriate. For a medium source impedance, a common emitter or common source topology may be used. With a high source resistance, a common collector or common drain topology may be appropriate. An input impedance match may not produce the lowest noise figure.

Biasing 

Another design issue is the noise introduced by biasing networks.

Applications 
LNAs are used in communications receivers such as in cellular telephones, GPS receivers, wireless LANs (WiFi), and satellite communications.

In a satellite communications system, the ground station receiving antenna uses an LNA because the received signal is weak since satellites have limited power and therefore use low-power transmitters.

The LNA boosts the antenna signal to overcome feed line losses between the antenna and the receiver.

LNAs can enhance the performance of software-defined radio (SDR) receiver systems. SDRs are typically designed to be general purpose and therefore the noise figure is not optimized for any one particular application. With an LNA and appropriate filter, performance is improved over a range of frequencies.

See also 
 Directional antenna
 Transducer

References

Further reading

External links 

 Conversion: distortion factor to distortion attenuation and THD

Electronic amplifiers